Riyan Ardiansyah (born 14 May 1996) is an Indonesian professional footballer who plays as a winger for Liga 1 club PSIS Semarang.

Club career

PS Bengkulu
He was signed for PS Bengkulu to play in Liga 2 in the 2017 season.

Persiwa Wamena
In 2018, Riyan Ardiansyah signed a one-year contract with Indonesian Liga 2 club Persiwa Wamena.

PSIS Semarang
In 2019, Riyan Ardiansyah signed a one-year contract with Indonesian Liga 1 club PSIS Semarang. Riyan made his debut on 10 July 2019 in a match against Borneo. On 4 September 2021, Riyan scored his first goal for PSIS against Persela Lamongan at the Wibawa Mukti Stadium, Bekasi. On 9 September 2022, Riyan scored hattrick in a 3–2 home win against Persikabo 1973 at Jatidiri Stadium, this is the first hat-trick in his career as a footballer and also first hat-trick local players in this league season. On 13 December, he scored the opening goal in a 2–0 win over Persija Jakarta.

On 21 January 2023, Riyan scored the only goal in PSIS's 1-0 victory over Arema.

Career statistics

Club

Notes

References

External links
 Riyan Ardiansyah at Soccerway

1996 births
Living people
Indonesian footballers
Liga 2 (Indonesia) players
Liga 1 (Indonesia) players
Persiwa Wamena players
PSIS Semarang players
Association football defenders
People from Pati Regency
Sportspeople from Central Java
21st-century Indonesian people